The Uruguayan ambassador in Santiago de Chile is the official representative of the Government in Montevideo to the Government of Chile.

List of representatives

References 

 
Chile
Uruguay